Estadio de Fútbol Universidad Simón Bolívar (English: football Stadium at the Simón Bolívar University) (also known as the Campo de fútbol de la Universidad Simón Bolívar and Campo Olímpico), is a football field located on the campus of the Universidad Simón Bolívar, in Caracas, Venezuela. The stadium is primarily used as a concert venue, operated by Evenpro, bringing many international acts to Caracas. Within the university, it is used as a practice field for many athletic events.

Events 
The stadium is used to perform cultural shows as well as sporting events, with big concerts from various national and international artists taking place there occasionally. Since the stadium is a public sports infrastructure that the university manages independently, permission from the university authorities is required for its use by entertainers. Some of the concerts presented at the stadium include:

Multi-purpose stadiums in Venezuela
Football venues in Caracas
1970 establishments in Venezuela